National Assembly elections were held in Bhutan in 2018; the first round was held on 15 September and the second round on 18 October.

The ruling People's Democratic Party of former Prime Minister Tshering Tobgay came third in the first round of voting, unexpectedly failing to advance to the second round and resulting in it losing all 32 seats. The second round was a contest between the Druk Phuensum Tshogpa, the only other party with parliamentary representation, and the unrepresented Druk Nyamrup Tshogpa, which received the most votes in the first round.

Electoral system
The 47 members of the National Assembly are elected from single-member constituencies. Primary elections are held in which voters cast votes for parties. The top two parties are then able to field candidates in the main round of voting, in which members are elected using first-past-the-post voting.

Results

By constituency

References

2018
Bhutan
2018 in Bhutan